The Diocese of Colombo (Anglican Church of Ceylon) is based in Colombo, Sri Lanka. The diocesan bishop's seat is Cathedral of Christ the Living Saviour.  The current bishop of Colombo is Dushantha Lakshman Rodrigo.

The Diocese of Colombo covers the Western, Southern, Eastern, Northern and Uva Provinces together with the Ratnapura, Nuwara Eliya and Puttalam districts.

History 
The first Church of England services were held on the island in 1796. In 1818, missionaries were sent to Ceylon to spread the church. Originally, it had been part of the diocese of Calcutta and later Madras. In 1930, the  Church of India, Burma and Ceylon became autonomous. The Diocese of Colombo was founded in 1845, as the diocese of the Church of England in Ceylon with the appointment of its first bishop, James Chapman. It was established by law in 1886.

In 1947, the churches of South India united to form the new Church of South India. The churches in North India and Pakistan followed soon after. Burma and Bangladesh formed their own church. Sri Lanka therefore became extraprovincial within the Anglican Communion under the metropolitical authority of the Archbishop of Canterbury.

In 1946, the Diocese of Kurunegala was formed out of the diocese of Colombo to include parts of the North-Western, North-Central and Central Provinces of Sri Lanka. The Diocese of Kurunagala was legally recognised in 1972. Together, the Diocese of Colombo and Kurunagala constitute the Church of Ceylon.

List of Bishops in Diocese of Colombo

See also 
 Cathedral of Christ the Living Saviour
 St Luke's Church, Borella
 St Michael and All Angels Church, Polwatte
 St. Paul's Church, Milagiriya
 St Peter's Church, Colombo

References

External links 
 One hundred years in Ceylon, or, The centenary volume of the Church Missionary Society in Ceylon, 1818-1918 (1922) Author: Balding, John William Madras: Printed at the Diocesan Press.
 The Church of Ceylon - her faith and mission Published in 1945, Printed at the Daily News Press by Bernard de Silva for the Church of Ceylon.
The Church of Ceylon: A history, 1945-1995  Editor: Medis, Published for the Diocese of Colombo.
 The Church of Ceylon (Anglican Communion)
 Anglican Church of Ceylon News
 The Church of Ceylon - World Council of Churches website
 Official website of the Church of Ceylon, Diocese of Colombo

Religious organizations established in 1845
Church of Ceylon
1845 establishments in Ceylon
Church of India, Burma and Ceylon
Anglican dioceses in Asia